Gwanaksan(Seoul National Univ.) Station (관악산(서울대)역) is a subway station on the Seoul Metropolitan Subway Sillim Line in Gwanak-gu, Seoul. It will be a transfer station with the Seoul Light Rail West Line in the future. From this station to Saetgang Station, all are underground sections. There are two late-night episodes.

History 
 February 7, 2021: Gwanaksan Station decided to be the station name
 September 16, 2021: Changed the station name to Gwanaksan(Seoul National Univ.) Station
 May 28, 2022: Opened

Gallery

References

Metro stations in Gwanak District
Seoul Metropolitan Subway stations
Railway stations opened in 2022